Taruga longinasus (common names: southern whipping frog, long-snouted tree-frog) is a species of frog in the family Rhacophoridae. It is endemic to Sri Lanka.

Its natural habitats are subtropical or tropical moist lowland forests, subtropical or tropical moist montane forests, freshwater marshes, and intermittent freshwater marshes.
It is threatened by habitat loss.

References

longinasus
Amphibians described in 1927
Frogs of Sri Lanka
Endemic fauna of Sri Lanka
Taxa named by Ernst Ahl
Taxonomy articles created by Polbot